Estonian Badminton Federation (abbreviation EBF; also named as Badminton Estonia) is one of the sport governing bodies in Estonia which deals with badminton.

EBF is established on 3 October 1965 in Tallinn. EBF is a member of Badminton World Federation (BWF) and Estonian Olympic Committee.

The executive leader of EBF is Mario Saunpere.

References

External links
 

Sports governing bodies in Estonia
Badminton in Estonia
Sports organizations established in 1965
National members of the Badminton World Federation